"Something About You" is a song by Australian record producer Hayden James, It was released on 19 December 2014 via the Teen Idols: A Future Classic Compilation. The one-track digital single was released on 22 May 2015 and remixes were released on 21 August 2015. The track was also released in the US via Casablanca Records.

The song was nominated for ARIA Award for Best Dance Release at the ARIA Music Awards of 2015, but lost to "You Were Right" by Rüfüs.

Background
In an interview with Mike Wass from Idolator, James said he wrote the song in two or three hours in 2014, however, the song took weeks to produce. He first played the song to Rüfüs and asked for their opinion. He said it is his voice in the chorus and a blend of his and George Maple's in the verses. James added "It made sense to me to write a song and not a dance track. I’m way more into soulful stuff. I’m actually making a song and I can get other people to remix it into something crazy if they want."

Music video
The official music video was released on 27 May 2015.

Track listing
 Digital download
 "Something About You" – 3:43

 Digital download (remixes)
 "Something About You"  – 5:26
 "Something About You"  – 5:41
 "Something About You"  – 4:40
 "Something About You"  – 5:00
 "Something About You"  – 6:01
 "Something About You"  – 7:59
 "Something About You"  – 4:38

Charts

Certifications

References

2014 singles
2014 songs
Hayden James songs
Songs written by Hayden James
Songs written by Alexander Burnett (musician)